Cross Gates and Whinmoor is a ward in the metropolitan borough of the City of Leeds, West Yorkshire, England.  It contains nine listed buildings that are recorded in the National Heritage List for England.  Of these, one is listed at Grade II*, the middle of the three grades, and the others are at Grade II, the lowest grade.  The ward is a suburb to the east of the centre of Leeds, and is mainly residential.  Most of the listed buildings are on the eastern rural edge of the ward, and consist of houses and associated structures, a farmhouse, and two railway bridges.


Key

Buildings

References

Citations

Sources

 

Lists of listed buildings in West Yorkshire